Pan is a Filipino folk/punk rock band formed in 2002.  The band members were composed of former Yano bandmates Dong Abay on vocals, Onie Badiang on guitar. the duo added session members Milo Duane Cruz and Melvin Leyson who handle the bass and drums respectively during live gigs.

the band release only one album "Parnaso ng Payaso". the song "Hula" won as (Best Folk/Pop Recording at the AWIT Awards in 2003), "Mabuhay!"("Long Live") and "Rebolusyon" ("Revolution"). Some notable songs from the album include "Dumpsite", and "Hula".

Pan played for the local rock circuit, but in 2003, Abay decided to go back to school to finish his bachelor's degree in UP.  Thus, the demise of Pan.

Discography

Awards

References

Filipino rock music groups
Musical groups established in 2002